The 1962 Toledo Rockets football team was an American football team that represented Toledo University in the Mid-American Conference (MAC) during the 1962 NCAA University Division football season. In their third and final season under head coach Clive Rush, the Rockets compiled a 3–6 record (1–5 against MAC opponents), finished in sixth place in the MAC, and were outscored by all opponents by a combined total of 176 to 133.

The team's statistical leaders included Butch Yenrick with 552 passing yards, Frank Baker with 613 rushing yards, and Jim Thibert with 198 receiving yards.

Schedule

References

Toledo
Toledo Rockets football seasons
Toledo Rockets football